Episkopi Cantonment is the capital of Akrotiri and Dhekelia, a British overseas territory on the island of Cyprus, administered as a military base. It is located in the northwestern part of the Western Sovereign Base Area (Akrotiri), one of the two areas which comprise the territory. Although it is not the largest of the British military bases on the island, it is home to both the civilian and military administration headquarters of the Sovereign Base Areas. Episkopi is the current command centre of British Forces Cyprus.

Etymology
The word 'Episkopi' in Episkopi Cantonment's name comes from the Greek word Επισκοπικός meaning "Episcopal." The cantonment was named so due to the site previously serving as the bishop's seat of an Orthodox diocese.

Transportation
Paved motorways and other smaller roads connect the cantonment area with the rest of Akrotiri and Dhekelia.

See also
British Forces Cyprus
Dhekelia Cantonment
Episkopi, Limassol
Royal Military Police
Sovereign Base Areas
Sovereign Base Areas Customs
Sovereign Base Areas Police
St. John's School

References

Geography of Akrotiri and Dhekelia
Capitals of British Overseas Territories
Military of Sovereign Base Areas of Akrotiri and Dhekelia